Gul Agha may refer to:

 Gul Agha Ishakzai, (born 1972), former head of the Finance Commission in Afghanistan
 Gul Agha Sherzai, (born 1954), Governor of Nangarhar province in Afghanistan
 Gul Agha (computer scientist), American computer scientist